Balss Maskā (Voice in a Mask) is a Latvian reality singing competition television series based on the Masked Singer franchise, which originated from the South Korean version of the show King of Mask Singer. The show was announced in August 2020, the same month shooting for the first season began. It premiered on TV3 Latvia on 13 September 2020.

Production

Format
A group of celebrities compete anonymously on stage, singing in full costumes over a series of episodes. Each episode, a portion of the competitors are paired off into face-off competitions, in which each will perform a song of his or her choice. From each face-off, the panelists and live audience vote: the winner's safe for the week, while the loser is put up for elimination. At the end of the episode, the losers of the face-offs are then subjected to new votes of the panelists to determine who will not continue; the eliminated singer then enters a special room backstage where it turns its back to the camera, takes off its mask, then turns around to reveal his/her identity. In addition to the singing competition, hints to each masked singer's identity are offered during the show. Pre-taped interviews are given as hints and feature the celebrities' distorted voices. The panelists are given time to speculate the identity of the singer after the performance and ask them a single question to try and determine their identity. The show is pre-recorded in a studio in Riga.

Costumes
The costumes are partly replicates that were used in other international versions, notably on the Estonian counterpart, as well as national motifs such as Nelabais, a devil-like creature from the Latvian mythology or Rīga, the patron of the countries capital of the same name. The majority of the costumes were designed by Estonian designer Liisi Eesmaa, while three of them are the creation of Ance Beinaroviča in cooperation with the Latvian National Theatre.

Panelists and host
 Mārtiņš Spuris was announced as the show's presenter on 8 August 2020. The panel of judges was announced on 19 August 2020. It consists of popular singer Samanta Tīna (the country's chosen representative for the canceled Eurovision Song Contest in 2020), comedian Baiba Sipeniece-Gavare, Jānis Šipkēvics Sr., journalist and director of Radio SWH, and Jānis Krīvēns, lead singer of the rock group Singapūras Satīns.

Series overview

Season 1 (2020)

Episodes

Episode 1 (13 September)

Episode 2 (20 September)

Episode 3 (27 September)

Episode 4 (4 October)

Episode 5 (11 October)

Episode 6 (18 October)

Episode 7 (25 October)

Episode 8 (1 November)

Episode 9 (8 November)

Episode 10 (15 November)

Episode 11 (29 November)

Season 2 (2021)

Episodes

Episode 1 (7 March)

Episode 2 (14 March)

Episode 3 (21 March)

Episode 4 (28 March)

Episode 5 (4 April)

Episode 6 (11 April)

Episode 7 (18 April)

Episode 8 (25 April)

Episode 9 (2 May)

Episode 10 (9 May)

Season 3 (2023)

Episodes

Episode 1 (26 February)

References

External links
 
 

Masked Singer
TV3 (Latvia) original programming